Beefcake (1999) is a docudrama homage to the muscle magazines of the 1940s, 1950s, and 1960s—in particular, Physique Pictorial magazine, published quarterly by Bob Mizer of the Athletic Model Guild. It was inspired by a picture book by F. Valentine Hooven III (published by Taschen) and was directed by Thom Fitzgerald.

The film stars Daniel MacIvor, Carroll Godsman, Jack Griffin Mazieka, Jonathan Torrens, and Joshua Peace in pastiche recreations of life at the Athletic Model Guild, mixed with interviews with models and photographers whose work actually appeared in the early magazines, including Jack LaLanne and Joe Dallesandro. The film was shot in Nova Scotia.

Beefcake was a follow up to The Hanging Garden, also produced by Thom Fitzgerald.

Beefcake premiered at the Sundance Film Festival in 1999 and was released by Strand Releasing in the United States; it was nominated for three Genie Awards.

Synopsis
The film looks at buff and muscular men of the 1950s in magazines and the repetitive industry that was popular in the health and fitness magazines but were primarily being purchased by homosexual men and underground homosexual communities. The person behind the literature was Bob Mizer, who "maintained a magazine and developed sexually explicit men's films for over 40 years." By the end of the film, a courtroom drama scene is shot as Mizer attempting to run a male-prostitute ring in the early '60s. Clips of Mizer's actual films are included in Beefcake.

Cast
  Daniel MacIvor as Bob Mizer  
  Joshua Peace as Neil E. O'Hara   
  Jack Griffin Mazeika as Red 
  Carroll Godsman as Delia Mizer  
  Jonathan Torrens as David  
  Thomas Cawood as Mizer's Attorney  
  Jaime Robertson as Prosecuting Attorney  
  Dick Sircom as Judge  
  Thom Fitzgerald as LaFleur's Attorney
  Orest Ulan as Defence (as Orest E Ulan)
  Glen Deveau as Soldier Just Off the Bus 
  Andrew Miller as Tiny 
  Marla McLean as Cabaret Singer 
  Daniel McLaren as AMG Model 
  Bernard Robichaud as Jukie 
  Marc St. Onge as Drug Addict 
  Steve MacLaughlin as LaFleur
  Andy Smith as Arthur Bob 
  James Mac Swain as Mr. Summers (Max of Hollywood)
  Michael Weir as AMG Model
  Marc Le Blanc as AMG Model 
  Timothy Phillips as Bob Mizer (age 12)
  Jonathan Langlois-Sadubin as Neil's Brother 
  Lucy Decoutere as Champ's Wife 
  Sarah Dunsworth as Blonde Kitten

Themes
As examined in the Ottawa Citizen, "this odd and colourful mix of interviews, dramatizations, re-creations and naughty homoerotic hanky-panky is made in the style-reflects-content story of Bob Mizer (played by Daniel MacIvor), the man who practically invented the 1950s idea of using muscle magazines to sell sex disguised as athleticism." At the time that this film was released, homophobia was not widely accepted in any culture. Although the magazine that Mizer ran (Athletic Model Guide) took a liking to homosexual men, "who could disguise their interest as a fascination with physical culture." However, it ended up that the magazine additionally grabbed the attention of many young women as well.

Reception
Dan Brown of the National Post claims the film is "the gay equivalent of every opening of every James Bond film ever made." He claims that there has been some pushback on the themes of the films such as the repetition of everyone leading a double life in the film. Viewers bring up questions such as "was everybody in that town leading a double life? Between the closeted homosexuals, the secret communists, the Jews with Anglicized names and the confidential drug addicts, filmmaker after filmmaker has portrayed the City of Angels as a place where everybody has something to hide."

Beefcake explores new themes of male nudity that has never been explored in film before, whereas female nudity has been part of art and film history for decades. Such an increase in nudity within the film is something dramatically different than the typical theme of a movie in the 1960s. Matt Radz of The Gazette explains that "but beefcake demonstrate, in a very graphic manner, plenty of other reasons why in the race to bare all, male nudity has always finished a very distant second." Ftizgerald puts much nudity into "Beefcake" and is a central theme of the film. Radz claims "Beefcake puts so many genitals on display, the title of that promising debut movie could be also used to describe this sophomore effort". Many film critics have had disappointment in the film which is a follow up of the Hanging Garden that is "one of the few memorable movies made in Canada in this decade (1990s)."

Awards & Nominations
 Winner for "Best Performance by an Actor in a Supporting Role" at the Atlantic Film Festival (1998) was Jonathan Torrens 
 Winner for "Art Direction" was awarded to Alan MacLeod and D'Arcy Poultney in 1997 
 Nominee at the Genie Awards in 2000 for: "Best Achievement in Editing," "Best Music Score," and "Best Original Song" 
 Nominee at the Verzaubert - International Gay & Lesbian Film Festival in 1999 for "Best Film"

References

Further reading
 Padva, Gilad. Nostalgic Physique: Displaying Foucauldian Muscles and Celebrating the Male Body in Beefcake. In Padva, Gilad, Queer Nostalgia in Cinema and Pop Culture, pp. 35–57 (Palgrave Macmillan, 2014).
 Hoven, F. Valentine.  Beefcake:  the muscle magazines of America, 1950 - 1970.  (Köln : Benedikt Taschen, ©1995, ISBNs 3822889393 9783822889398).

External links 
 
 
 Beefcake at Rotten Tomatoes

1999 drama films
1999 films
1999 LGBT-related films
Canadian docudrama films
Canadian LGBT-related films
Documentary films about gay men
Films directed by Thom Fitzgerald
Films shot in Nova Scotia
LGBT-related drama films
1990s English-language films
1990s Canadian films